Volato Aeronaves also known as Volato Aeronaves e Compósitos Ltda is a Brazilian aircraft manufacturer.

History
The founders of the company, Zizo Sola and Marcos Vilela, worked with Richard Allen Trickel Jr. in the USA in the 1990s. Richard Allen Trickel Jr. was the designer of the KIS 2, KIS 4, KIS Cruiser, Super Pulsar and Pulsar Super Cruiser aircraft, of which more than 300 were built. The idea of founding an experimental aircraft factory in Brazil arose from this collaboration. Together they first developed the Volato 400, a modern four-seater made of composite materials. They are currently working on a further development of the machine, the Volato 200, a two-seater. 

The company also produces composite parts for Embraer.

Aircraft

See also
Tri-R Technologies
Companhia Aeronáutica Paulista
Aero Bravo

References

External links

Aircraft manufacturers of Brazil
Ultralight aircraft
Companies based in São Paulo (state)
Brazilian brands